C86 is a cassette compilation released by the British music magazine NME in 1986, featuring new bands licensed from British independent record labels of the time. As a term, C86 quickly evolved into shorthand for a guitar-based music genre characterized by jangling guitars and melodic power pop song structures, although other musical styles were represented on the tape. In its time, it became a pejorative term for its associations with so-called "shambling" (a John Peel-coined description celebrating the self-conscious primitive approach of some of the music) and underachievement. The C86 scene is now recognized as a pivotal moment for independent music in the UK, as was recognized in the subtitle of the compilation's 2006 CD issue: CD86: 48 Tracks from the Birth of Indie Pop. 2014 saw the original compilation reissued in a 3CD expanded edition from Cherry Red Records; the 2014 box-set came with an 11,500-word book of sleevenotes by one of the tape's original curators, former NME journalist Neil Taylor.

The C86 name was a play on the labelling and length of blank compact cassette, commonly C60, C90 and C120, combined with 1986.

The C86 cassette
The tape was a belated follow-up to C81, a more eclectic collection of new bands, released by the NME in 1981 in conjunction with Rough Trade. C86 was similarly designed to reflect the new music scene of the time. It was compiled by NME writers Roy Carr, Neil Taylor and Adrian Thrills, who licensed tracks from labels including Creation, Subway, Probe Plus, Dan Treacy's Dreamworld Records, Jeff Barrett's Head Records, Pink, and Ron Johnson. Readers had to pay for the tape via mail order, although an LP was subsequently released on Rough Trade on 24 November 1986. The UK music press was in this period highly competitive, with four weekly papers documenting new bands and trends. There was a tendency to create and "discover" new musical subgenres artificially in order to heighten reader interest. NME journalists of the period subsequently agreed that C86 was an example of this, but also a byproduct of NME'''s "hip hop wars" - a schism in the paper (and among readers) between enthusiasts of contemporary progressive black music (for example, by Public Enemy and Mantronix), and fans of guitar-based music, as represented on C86.NME promoted the tape in conjunction with London's Institute of Contemporary Arts, who staged a week of gigs, in July 1986 which featured most of the acts on the compilation.

The tape included tracks by some more abrasive bands atypical of the perceived C86 jangle pop aesthetic: Stump, Bogshed, A Witness, The Mackenzies, Big Flame and The Shrubs.C86 was the twenty-third NME tape, although its catalogue number was NME022 (C81 had been dubbed COPY001). The rest of the tapes were compilations promoting labels' back catalogues and dedicated to R&B, Northern soul, jazz or reggae. C86 was followed up with a Billie Holiday compilation, Holiday Romance.

 Legacy 

Ex-NME staffer Andrew Collins summed up C86 by dubbing it "the most indie thing to have ever existed". Bob Stanley, a Melody Maker journalist in the late 1980s and founding member of pop band Saint Etienne, similarly said in a 2006 interview that C86 represented:

[the] beginning of indie music… It's hard to remember how underground guitar music and fanzines were in the mid-'80s; DIY ethics and any residual punk attitudes were in isolated pockets around the country and the C86 comp and gigs brought them together in an explosion of new groups.

Martin Whitehead, who ran Subway in the late 1980s, added a new political dimension to the importance of C86."Before C86, women could only be eye-candy in a band; I think C86 changed that - there were women promoting gigs, writing fanzines and running labels."

Some are more ambivalent about the tape's influence. Everett True, a writer for NME in 1986 under the name "The Legend!", called it "unrepresentative of its times . . . and even unrepresentative of the small narrow strata of music it thought it was representing." Alastair Fitchett, editor of the music site Tangents (and a fan of many of the bands on the tape), takes a polemical line: "(The NME) laid the foundations for the desolate wastelands of what we came to know by that vile term 'Indie'. What more reason do you need to hate it?" The Guardian published an article in 2014 debunking some of the negative myths about the cassette.

Follow-ups
In 1996, NME continued the tradition of compiling a new band album (this time a CD) by releasing C96. This had little impact, with Mogwai and Broadcast being the only acts on the compilation to subsequently enjoy mainstream success. Three other bands on the compilation - Babybird, The Delgados and Urusei Yatsura - had brief success in the United Kingdom after the compilation's release.

The significance of C86 was recognized by several events marking the 20th anniversary of the compilation's release in 2006:
 Sanctuary Records released CD86, a double-CD set compiled by Bob Stanley.
 The ICA hosted "C86 - Still Doing It For Fun", an exhibition and two nights of gigs celebrating the rise of British independent music.

Cherry Red's 2014 expanded reissue was marked by an NME C86 show on 14 June 2014 at Venue 229, London W1; acts from the original compilation included The Wedding Present, David Westlake of The Servants, The Wolfhounds and A Witness.

The 30-year anniversary of C86 saw the original compilation issued in a deluxe gatefold sleeved double-LP edition for Record Store Day 2016.

Cherry Red Records issued an imagined sequel compilation titled C87 in 2016, followed by C88, C89 and C90.

 Track listing 

 See also 

 CD86 (album) DIY ethic
 Fanzine
 Indie pop
 Indie rock
 NME Post-punk
 Punk ideologies
 Punk subculture

References

External sources

 Bladh, Krister Everything went Pop!, C86 and more, A wave and its rise and wake (pdf) 2005
 "Fire Escape Talking","Anoraky in the UK,C86, the punk that refuses to die"  ("Fire Escape Talking blog", July 7, 2006)
 Fitchett, Alastair, C86 (Tangents Blog, July 25, 2005)
 Hann, Michael Fey City Rollers (The Guardian, 13 October 2004)
 Hasted, Nick "How an NME cassette launched indie music" ("The Independent", October 27, 2006)
 Pearce, Kevin A Different Story; The Ballad of the June Brides(Tangents, March 2001)
 Reynolds, Simon Rip It Up and Start Again: Post Punk 1978-1984 (Faber and Faber, 2005) 
 Reynolds, Simon The C86 Indie Scene is back (Time Out, October 23, 2006)
 Stanley, Bob, Where were you in C86? (The Times October 20, 2006)
 True, Everett C86 Q&A(Plan B Blog July 22, 2005)
 Wire, Nicky The Birth of Uncool(The Guardian'', October 25, 2006)
 C86 Profile "Indie MP3-Keeping C86 alive" blog

1986 compilation albums
Alternative rock compilation albums
Indie pop albums by British artists
Jangle pop compilation albums
Post-punk compilation albums
Rough Trade Records compilation albums
New Musical Express
Compilation albums included with magazines